The Kitt Peak National Observatory (KPNO) is a United States astronomical observatory located on Kitt Peak of the Quinlan Mountains in the Arizona-Sonoran Desert on the Tohono Oʼodham Nation,  west-southwest of Tucson, Arizona. With more than twenty optical and two radio telescopes, it is one of the largest gatherings of astronomical instruments in the Earth's northern hemisphere.

Kitt Peak National Observatory was founded in 1958. It is home to what was the largest solar telescope in the world, and many large astronomical telescopes of the late 20th century in the United States.

The observatory was administered by the National Optical Astronomy Observatory (NOAO) from the early 1980s until 2019, after which it was overseen by NOIRLab.

In June 2022, the Contreras Fire led to the evacuation of Kitt Peak. The fire reached the summit at 2 a.m. on Friday, June 17. Four non-scientific buildings, including a dormitory, were lost in the fire.  As of Monday, June 20, the extent of damage to the telescopes is still being assessed.

General information
Kitt Peak was selected by its first director, Aden B. Meinel, in 1958 as the site for a national observatory under contract with the National Science Foundation (NSF) and was administered by the Association of Universities for Research in Astronomy. The land was leased from the Tohono Oʼodham under a perpetual agreement. The second director (1960 to 1971) was Nicholas U. Mayall. In 1982, NOAO was formed to consolidate the management of three optical observatories — Kitt Peak; the National Solar Observatory facilities at Kitt Peak and Sacramento Peak, New Mexico; and the Cerro Tololo Inter-American Observatory in Chile. The observatory sites are under lease from the Tohono O'odham Nation at the amount of a quarter dollar per acre yearly, which was overwhelmingly approved by the Council in the 1950s. In 2005, the Tohono O'odham Nation brought suit against the National Science Foundation to stop further construction of gamma ray detectors in the Gardens of the Sacred Tohono O'odham Spirit I'itoi, which are just below the summit.

The largest optical instruments at KPNO are the Mayall 4 meter telescope and the WIYN 3.5-meter telescope; there are also several two- and one-meter class telescopes. The McMath–Pierce solar telescope was for many decades the largest solar telescope in the world and the largest unobstructed reflector (no secondary mirror in the path of incoming light). The ARO 12m Radio Telescope is also at the location.

Kitt Peak is famous for hosting the first telescope (an old 91 cm reflector) used to search for near-Earth asteroids, and calculating the probability of an impact with planet Earth.

Kitt Peak hosts an array of programs for the public to take part in, including:
 Daytime tours, speaking about the history of the observatory as well as touring a major research telescope.
 The Nightly Observing Program (NOP), which allows visitors to arrive in the late afternoon, watch the sunset, and use binoculars and telescopes to view the cosmos.
 Additionally, there is the Overnight Telescope Observing Program (OTOP). This program allows for a one-on-one, full night of observing using any of the visitor center's telescopes. Guests may choose to do DSLR imaging, CCD imaging, or simply take in the sights with their eye to the telescope.

Kitt Peak's Southeastern Association for Research and Astronomy (SARA) Telescope was featured in the WIPB-PBS documentary, "Seeing Stars in Indiana". The project followed SARA astronomers from Ball State University to the observatory and featured time-lapse images from various points around Kitt Peak.

A major project in the 2010s at Kitt Peak is the Dark Energy Spectroscopic Instrument for the Mayall.

History 

The Kitt Peak National Observatory of the United States was dedicated on March 16, 1960. At the dedication a 36-inch telescope and various facilities were ready. Construction was underway for the then planned 84 inch telescope. (i.e. the KPNO 2.1 meter)

The 84 inch (2.1 m) had its first light in September 1964.

Over the decades the mountaintop hosted many telescopes, and achieved a variety of discoveries. Some examples of astronomical research KPNO contributed to include the study of dark matter, cosmic distances, high-redshift galaxies, and the Boötes Void. In addition, the observatory has engaged in variety of public outreach and education programs.

In 2018, KPNO established plans for its Windows on the Universe Center for Astronomy Outreach.

Notable discoveries 
In 1976 the Mayall Telescope was used to discover methane ice on Pluto.

The 90 cm Spacewatch telescope was used to discover the Kuiper belt body, 20000 Varuna in the year 2000. This was discovered by an astronomer noticing the slow moving object in a blink comparison.

KPNO Gallery

Climate
Due to its high elevation, the observatory experiences a subtropical highland climate (Cfb) with a much cooler and wetter climate throughout the year than most of the Sonoran Desert.

See also
 List of astronomical observatories
 List of radio telescopes
 List of telescope types
 Richard Green (astronomer)

References

Further reading
 Discover Magazine article about Kitt Peak, May 2005
 Kitt Peak docent training book, 2008

External links

 Kitt Peak National Observatory Visitor Center – visiting and tour information
 Kitt Peak Webcam
 Kitt Peak Clear Sky Chart Forecasts of observing conditions
 NOAA general forecast for KPNO
 NOAA detailed forecast for KPNO
 Observing At Kitt Peak – General Overview for Observers and Staff

 
Astronomical observatories in Arizona
Buildings and structures in Pima County, Arizona
Minor-planet discovering observatories
Museums in Pima County, Arizona
National Science Foundation
Science museums in Arizona
Sonoran Desert
Tohono O'odham Nation
University of Arizona
Tourist attractions in Pima County, Arizona
NOIRLab
1958 establishments in Arizona
Scientific organizations established in 1958